Cursed relates to adversity thought to be inflicted by supernatural forces or spirits (a curse).

Cursed or The Cursed may also refer to:

Films 
 Cursed (2004 fiim), by Yoshihiro Hoshino
 Cursed (2005 film), by Wes Craven, starring Christina Ricci
 The Cursed (2021 film), by Sean Ellis

Music 
 Cursed (band), a hardcore punk band
 Cursed (Morgoth album), 1991
 Cursed (Ion Dissonance album), 2010
 Cursed (Scaramanga Six album), 2011
 Cursed (Rotten Sound album), 2011
 Cursed (Righteous Vendetta album), 2017
 "Cursed", a song by Robbie Wiiliams from his 2002 album Escapology

Television 
 Cursed (2000 TV series), a 2000–2001 sitcom
 The Cursed (TV series), a South Korean TV series
 "Cursed" (House), a 2005 episode of the TV series House
 Cursed (2020 TV series), a streaming television series
 "Cursed", an episode of the Japanese-American animated TV series Hi Hi Puffy AmiYumi
 "Cursed!", an episode of the animated TV series The Casagrandes
 "Cursed!", an episode of the animated TV series Amphibia

Other uses
 Cursed (Buffy/Angei novel), a 2003 original novel based on the television series Buffy the Vampire Slayer and its spin-off Angei
 Cursed, the second novel in Benedict Jacka's Alex Verus series
 Cursed!, a play by Australian filmmaker Kodie Bedford

See also
 Conomor the Cursed, sixth-century ruler of Brittany
 Accursed (disambiguation)